Skjelderup is a Norwegian surname. Notable people with the surname include:

 Jacob Worm Skjelderup (1804–1863), Norwegian politician
 Michael Skjelderup (1769–1852), Norwegian physician

See also
 Skjellerup

Norwegian-language surnames